Hemeroplanis historialis is a species of moth in the family Erebidae.

The MONA or Hodges number for Hemeroplanis historialis is 8472.

References

Further reading

 
 
 

Boletobiinae
Articles created by Qbugbot
Moths described in 1882